Sai Lone San Khat  (born 13 March 1965) is a Burmese politician who currently serves as a House of Nationalities member of parliament for Shan State № 7 constituency.

Early life and education
He was  born on  13 March 1965 in Tachileik, Shan State, Burma(Myanmar).

Political career
He is a member of the National League for Democracy. In the Myanmar general election, 2015, he was elected as an Amyotha Hluttaw MP and elected representative from Shan State № 7 parliamentary  constituency.

References

National League for Democracy politicians
1965 births
Living people
People from Shan State
Burmese people of Shan descent